Fort Collins Downtown Airport  was a public use airport located  east of the central business district of Fort Collins, a city in Larimer County, Colorado, United States. The airport closed on November 1, 2006.

History 
The airport opened in 1966 and was known as Valley Airport. Sometime before 1976 it was renamed Fort Collins Airpark and the following year it was named Downtown Fort Collins Airport. It was located northwest of the intersection of East Mulberry and South Timberline Roads.

Facilities and aircraft 
Fort Collins Downtown Airport was situated at an elevation of 4,939 feet (1,505 m) above mean sea level.  It had one asphalt paved runway designated 11/29 which measured 5,326 by 44 feet (1,623 x 13 m). It also has a turf runway designated E/W which measured 3400 by 50 feet (1,036 x 15 m).

The airport had an average of 48 aircraft operations per day: 100% general aviation and <1% military aviation. There were 126 aircraft based at this airport: 90 single-engine, 20 multi-engine, 15 helicopters, and 1 glider.

References

External links 
 Aerial image as of 4 October 1999 from USGS The National Map

Defunct airports in Colorado
Airports in Colorado
Transportation buildings and structures in Larimer County, Colorado